The 2008–09 FIBA Americas League was the second edition of the first-tier and most important professional international club basketball competition in the regions of South America, Central America, the Caribbean, and Mexico, with the winner of the competition being crowned as the best team and champion of all of those regions. It began on December 4. The first stage was a round robin phase, with four teams in each group. Each of the groups were played in different cities, (Arecibo, Mar del Plata, Sunchales, and Xalapa). The first team from each group advanced to the Final 4 round-robin stage that took place in the city of Xalapa, Mexico.

Teams allocation 

The labels in the brackets show how each team qualified for the place of its starting round (TH: Americas League title holders, LSH: Liga Sudamerican title holders):
LC: Qualified through a licensed club with a long-term licence
1st, 2nd, etc.: League position after Playoffs

Group stage

Group A (Arecibo)
Minas Tênis Clube advanced due to a better goal average.

|}

Group B (Mar del Plata)

|}

Group C (Sunchales)

|}

Group D (Xalapa)

|}

Final 4

Round 1

Round 2

Round 3

Statistics

Top Scorer
 Leandro Garcia Morales (  Club Biguá )

Assists Leader
 Facundo Sucatzky (  Minas Tênis Clube )

Awards

Grand Finals MVP
 Alex Ribeiro Garcia  (  Brasília )

External links
FIBA Americas League 
FIBA Americas League 
FIBA Americas  
FIBA Liga Americas Twitter 
LatinBasket.com FIBA Americas League 
Liga de las Américas YouTube Channel 

2008–09
2008–09 in South American basketball
2008–09 in North American basketball